Giovanni Michael Frontin (born 25 November 1977) is a Mauritian former boxer. He competed in the men's lightweight event at the 2000 Summer Olympics He is widely recognised as one of the best talents in boxing to compete for his country, with little other challengers ever making it this far.
NEVER UNDERESTIMATE GIOVANNI's POWER- is the saying used by his Dad at ringside at the 2000 olympics

References

External links
 

1977 births
Living people
Mauritian male boxers
Olympic boxers of Mauritius
Boxers at the 2000 Summer Olympics
Boxers at the 1998 Commonwealth Games
Boxers at the 2006 Commonwealth Games
Commonwealth Games silver medallists for Mauritius
Commonwealth Games bronze medallists for Mauritius
Commonwealth Games medallists in boxing
Place of birth missing (living people)
Lightweight boxers
Medallists at the 1998 Commonwealth Games
Medallists at the 2006 Commonwealth Games